Protein unc-13 homolog D, also known as munc13-4, is a protein that in humans is encoded by the UNC13D gene.

Function 

Munc13-4 is a member of the UNC13 family, containing similar domain structure as other family members but lacking an N-terminal phorbol ester-binding C1 domain present in other Munc13 proteins. The protein appears to play a role in vesicle maturation during exocytosis and is involved in regulation of cytolytic granules secretion.

Munc13-4 is an essential protein in the intracellular trafficking and exocytosis of lytic granules. It is targeted to CD63 positive secretory lysosomes. The C-terminal C2 domain of the protein is involved in this process.

Clinical significance 

Mutations in the UNC13D gene are associated with hemophagocytic lymphohistiocytosis type 3.

References

Further reading

External links